Pilosocereus piauhyensis is a species of plant in the family Cactaceae. It is endemic to Brazil, in the states of Piauí, Ceará, and Rio Grande do Norte. Its natural habitat is rocky areas.

References

piauhyensis
Cacti of South America
Endemic flora of Brazil
Flora of Rio Grande do Norte
Environment of Piauí
Environment of Ceará
Near threatened flora of South America
Taxonomy articles created by Polbot
Plants described in 1908